The Independent Advertiser was an American patriot publication, founded in 1748 in Boston by the then 26-year-old Samuel Adams, advocating republicanism, liberty and independence from Great Britain. Published by Gamaliel Rogers and Daniel Fowle, the Advertiser consisted primarily of essays written by a group of "gentlemen" on topics of contemporary New England politics.

References

1748 establishments in  Massachusetts
18th century in Boston
Publications established in 1748
Newspapers published in Boston
Defunct newspapers published in Massachusetts
Newspapers of colonial America
Samuel Adams